A Village Affair is a 1995 British television film based on the 1989 eponymous novel by Joanna Trollope. It was broadcast by ITV on 17 April 1995.  The film was directed by Moira Armstrong from a teleplay by Alma Cullen.

Plot
Alice and Martin Jordan arrive with their three children to live in the quiet English village of Pitcombe, and all seems to be well at first. But there is a secret below the surface which begins to emerge after Alice meets Clodagh Unwin, the daughter of local landowner Sir Ralph Unwin.

Cast
 Sophie Ward - Alice Jordan
 Kerry Fox - Clodagh Unwin
 Nathaniel Parker - Martin Jordan
 Jeremy Northam - Anthony Jordan
 Michael Gough - Sir Ralph Unwin
 Claire Bloom - Cecily Jordan
 Barbara Jefford - Lady Unwin
 Peter Jeffrey - Peter Morris
 Rosalie Crutchley - Lettice Deverel
 Philip Voss - Richard Jordan
 Heather Canning - Elizabeth Meadows

Keira Knightley appeared in the role of Alice's daughter, Natasha Jordan.

Home media
A Village Affair was released on VHS in Europe by Odyssey Video Ltd. on 28 September 1997. The DVD was released by Odyssey on 30 June 2003.

The North American region DVD was released by Acorn Media on 26 May 2009.

References

External links

  A Village Affair at Warner Sisters

1995 films
1995 drama films
1995 LGBT-related films
1995 television films
1990s British films
British LGBT-related television films
Lesbian-related films
LGBT-related drama films
Television shows based on British novels
ITV television dramas